Peter Schwingen (14 October 1813, Muffendorf, now a district of Bonn - 6 May 1863, Düsseldorf) was a German genre and portrait painter; associated with the Düsseldorfer Malerschule.

Life and work 

He was the son of a small farmer who also worked as a watchman. At the age of nineteen, thanks to a grant from the Prussian government, he was able to enroll at the Kunstakademie Düsseldorf. His instructors there included Karl Ferdinand Sohn, Theodor Hildebrandt and Friedrich Wilhelm von Schadow. His marks at the academy were mostly average. In 1837, shortly before the birth of his daughter, Caroline, he married Magdalene Schmitz, his landlord's daughter.

He first became known for his atmospheric paintings depicting St. Martin's Eve. Soon, he soon received numerous orders from throughout the region; developing his own style of portraits, which included detailed interiors, inspired by Dutch Golden Age paintings. His portrait characterizations were also inspired by the works of Heinrich Christoph Kolbe. This combination produced an important record of bourgeois domestic life, in the decade leading up to the revolutions of 1848. Perhaps his best known work of this type is a portrait of the Elberfeld merchant and landowner, . He would eventually produce about fourteen portraits of Weerth, his family, and friends.

His genre scenes are largely devoted to his native rural environment. His early themes were highly varied. Leading up to the revolutions, they took on a more political tone; notably in The Distraint and Return from the Fields. In his later years, he focused on large formats, and earned a considerable income form their sales, which allowed him to maintain a fine apartment for his family. It appears he did not die "poor and forgotten" as early biographies assert. He is believed to have created approximately 200 paintings, of which 150 are accounted for.

The art historian, was the first to research his works. The Peter-Schwingen-Gesellschaft in Bad Godesberg is dedicated to researching and publishing his works, and he is now considered a major artist of the Düsseldorf school.

References

Further reading 
 "Schwingen, Peter". In: Friedrich von Boetticher: Malerwerke des neunzehnten Jahrhunderts. Beitrag zur Kunstgeschichte. Vol.II, Dresden 1898, pg.717
 Walter Cohen: "Peter Schwingen. Leben und Werk", In: Mitteilungen des Kunstvereins für die Rheinlande und Westfalen, Vol.1, Düsseldorf 1932
 Pia Heckes and Horst Heidermann: Peter Schwingen (1813–1863). Leben und Werk, Rheinlandia, 1995 
 Pia Heckes: "Peter Schwingen (1813–1863). Zum 200. Geburtstag des Malers aus Muffendorf", In: Godesberger Heimatblätter. Vol.50, Bonn 2012, pp. 246–251

External links 

 
 Biography and notes @ Portal Rheinische Geschichte

1813 births
1863 deaths
19th-century German painters
19th-century German male artists
German portrait painters
German genre painters
Kunstakademie Düsseldorf alumni
People from Bonn